Sphaerodactylus klauberi is a species of gecko, a lizard in the family Sphaerodactylidae The species is endemic to the archipelago of Puerto Rico.

Common names
Common names for S. klauberi include Klauber's dwarf gecko, Klauber's least gecko, Puerto Rican highland sphaero, Puerto Rican upland gecko, and Puerto Rican upland sphaero.

Etymology
The epithet or specific name, klauberi, is in honor of American herpetologist Laurence Monroe Klauber.

Description
Sphaerodactylus klauberi is one of the larger-sized Sphaerodactylus species. Its colorings consist of a dark-brown upper body with darker-brown or black spots which become larger on the tail. The underbody is usually orange or reddish-pink with a gray throat that may have dark mottled areas.

Behavior
Like all Sphaerodactylus species, S. klauberi is voiceless. It is mostly active at night.

Diet
S. klauberi is an insectivore.

Reproduction
The female of S. klauberi lays one hard-shelled egg that can be as large as her head. The egg's incubation lasts 2 to 3 months.

Habitat
S. klauberi specimens have been collected between 160 ft (50 m) and 3,600 ft (1,097 m) in elevation. They can sometimes be seen on the ground or on low branches in the Tabonuco, Colorado, and Palma Sierra sections of the Caribbean National Rain Forest.

See also

List of amphibians and reptiles of Puerto Rico
Fauna of Puerto Rico
List of endemic fauna of Puerto Rico

References

Further reading
Grant C (1931). "The sphaerodactyls of Porto Rico, Culebra and Mona islands". J. Dept. Agr. Porto Rico 15 (3): 199–213. (Sphaerodactylus klauberi, new species, p. 207).
Thomas R, Schwartz A (1966). "Sphaerodactylus (Gekkonidae) in the greater Puerto Rico region". Bull. Florida State Mus. 10 (6): 193–260. (Sphaerodactylus klauberi, pp. 236–240).

klauberi
Lizards of the Caribbean
Endemic fauna of Puerto Rico
Reptiles of Puerto Rico
Reptiles described in 1931
Taxa named by Chapman Grant